FabricLive.63 is a 2012 DJ mix album by Digital Soundboy Soundsystem. The album was released as part of the FabricLive Mix Series.

Track list

References

External links

Fabric: FabricLive.63

Fabric (club) albums
2012 compilation albums